Galtara elongata is a moth of the subfamily Arctiinae. It was described by Charles Swinhoe in 1907. It is found in the Democratic Republic of the Congo, Ethiopia, Kenya and Rwanda.

References

Nyctemerina
Moths described in 1907